Tapsi (Stylized TAPSI , Former Tap30)  is an Iranian ridesharing company, cross platform application for carpooling.

It works in 15 of Iranian cities. The mobile app is released for iOS and Android, HarmonyOS.

Application features 

 Ride cost calculator
 Rating driver and ride
 Travel security feature

Service 

 Classic
 Carpool
 Calling in for ordering ride
 Delivery
 Ride accessibility for disabled people
Hailing taxicab

History

Rebrand 
In 2019 the company changed logo.

Lawsuit 
Tapsi sued Snapp in an antitrust case but was dismissed by the council of competition.

References

External links 

Android (operating system) software
IOS software
Sharing economy